Hay El Hanaa is a quartier of Casablanca, Morocco.

Neighbourhoods of Casablanca
Morocco geography articles needing translation from French Wikipedia